The Council of Secretaries of Puerto Rico is the group composed by the heads of the executive departments of the government of Puerto Rico. The Council is charged with leading the different sectors of public administration within the government and does not constitute an agency by itself.

The Council, together with the Cabinet-level officers, compose the Cabinet of Puerto Rico.

Background
The establishment of the Council is proclaimed by Article IV of the Constitution of Puerto Rico which establishes that the Governor shall be assisted by Secretaries whom shall collectively constitute the Governor's advisory council and be designated as the Council of Secretaries.

Each Secretary is nominated by the Governor and then presented to the Senate for advice and consent by a simple majorityexcept for the Secretary of State who requires the advice and consent of both the Senate and the House of Representatives. If the Secretaries are confirmed they are sworn in and begin their duties immediately afterwards. However, Secretaries appointed during a legislative recess may begin serving immediately under a recess appointment until the end of the following regular session of the Legislative Assembly, or rejected by the Senate, whichever occurs first, should they not be confirmed.

The Constitution of Puerto Rico established eight Secretaries, namely: the Secretary of Agriculture and Commerce, Education, Health, Justice, Labor, Public Works, State, and Treasury.

The Secretary of Agriculture and Commerce evolved into two different posts: the Secretary of Agriculture and the Secretary of Economic Development and Commerce, while the Secretary of Labor evolved into the Secretary of Labor and Human Resources, and the Secretary of Public Works into the Secretary of Transportation and Public Works.

The creation of more executive departments by Puerto Rican law established more Secretaries, namely: the Secretary of Consumer Affairs, Corrections and Rehabilitation, Family Affairs, Housing, Natural and Environmental Resources, and Sports and Recreation.

Current posts

References

 
Members of the Cabinet of Puerto Rico